Apellonia, also Apollonia (Ἀπολλωνία), was a town and polis (city-state) of ancient Crete.

The site of Apellonia is located near modern Agia Pelagia.

References

Populated places in ancient Crete
Former populated places in Greece
Cretan city-states